The Women's EHF European Cup is an annual team handball competition for women's clubs of Europe. It was known as the EHF City Cup until the 1999–2000 season and the EHF Challenge Cup until the 2019–20 season. It is currently the third-tier competition of European club handball.

Summary

Titles by club

Titles by nations

See also
 EHF European Cup
 Women's EHF European League
 Women's EHF Champions League

References

External links 
 

 
European Handball Federation competitions
Women's handball competitions
Recurring sporting events established in 1993
Multi-national professional sports leagues